Derek Allen Macaulay  is a Canadian Forces officer serving as a major-general in the Canadian Army.

Background 
Macaulay joined the Canadian Forces as part of the Officer Candidate Training Program in 1989 and was commissioned as an armoured officer in the Lord Strathcona's Horse (Royal Canadians). He served as chief of staff of the Combined Joint Forces Land Component Command Iraq from April 2015 to March 2016 and then became commander of 5th Canadian Division (The Mighty Maroon Machine) in May 2017. He was appointed the deputy commander of the Canadian Army on July 5, 2019, and has served as the acting commander of the Canadian Army and chief of the Army Staff since Wayne Eyre was designated as acting chief of the Defense Staff from 24 February 2021 to 19 April 2021. Major General Michel-Henri St-Louis succeeded him in the role.

Macaulay was awarded a Meritorious Service Decoration following his tenure in Iraq in 2015/16.

References 

Canadian generals
Canadian military personnel of the War in Afghanistan (2001–2021)
Living people
Recipients of the Meritorious Service Decoration
Year of birth missing (living people)
Lord Strathcona's Horse officers